Jean-Charles Seneca (born 23 October 1945) is a Monégasque fencer. He competed in the individual épée event at the 1972 Summer Olympics. He was also Monaco's flag bearer during the Opening Ceremony.

He reached the final of 1972 Challenge Martini - épée in London

References

External links
 

1945 births
Living people
Monegasque male épée fencers
Olympic fencers of Monaco
Fencers at the 1972 Summer Olympics